Jean-Charles Chenu (30 August 1808 – 12 November 1879) was a French physician, naturalist and author.

Bibliography
Natural history

Illustrations conchyliologiques ou description et figures de toutes les coquilles connues vivantes et fossiles, classées suivant le système de Lamarck modifié d'après les progrès de la science et comprenant les genres nouveaux et les espèces rècemment découvertes (1842–1854)
 1842. Tome I. - Volume one contains ammonites, land snails and sea snails.
 1845. Histoire Naturelle des Coquilles D'Angleterre. Paris, A. Franck. - This is translation in French from English of work by Edward Donovan. The Natural History of British Shells, including Figures and Descriptions of all the Species Hitherto Discovered in Great Britain, Systematically Arranged in the Linnean Manner, with Scientific and General Observations on Each., 5 volumes.
 Jean-Charles Chenu. 1845. Conchologie Americáine ou descriptions et figures des coquilles du nord de l'Amérique Paris, A. Franck, Libraire-Éditeur, rue Richelieu, 69,
Leçons élémentaires d'histoire naturelle, comprenant un aperçu sur toute la zoologie et un Traité de conchyliologie, (1846)
Encyclopédie d'histoire naturelle ou Traité complet de cette science d'après les travaux des naturalistes les plus éminents, (1850 - 1861) accompagné des Tables alphabétiques des noms vulgaires et scientifiques de tous les animaux décrits et figurés dans cette encyclopédie, dressées par Desmarests
Manuel de conchyliologie et de paléontologie conchyliologée, (1859 - 1862)
Leçons élémentaires sur l'histoire naturelle des oiseaux, (1862 - 1863)

Medical

Rapport sur le choléra-morbus, (1835)
Rapport au conseil de santé des armées sur les résultats du service médico-chirurgical aux ambulances de Crimée et aux hôpitaux militaires français de Turquie, pendant la campagne d'Orient en 1854-1856-1856, (1865)
De la mortalité dans l'armée et des moyens d'économiser la vie humaine, (1870)
Statistique médico-chirurgicale de la campagne d'Italie en 1859 et 1860, (2 volumes et un atlas, 1869)
Recrutement de l'armée et population de la France, (1867)

References

Anonym 1874 [Chenu, J.] Boston Advert. 134(73).
Anonym 1880 [Biographien] Zool. Anz. 3 144.
Anonym 1880 [Chenu, J.] Amer. Natural. 14 151.
Constantin, R. 1992 Memorial des Coléopteristes Français. Bull. liaison Assoc. Col. reg. parisienne , Paris (Suppl. 14) : 1-92.
Evenhuis, N. L. 1997 Litteratura taxonomica dipterorum (1758-1930). Volume 1 (A-K); Volume 2 (L-Z). Leiden, Backhuys Publishers.
Lhoste, J. 1987 Les entomologistes français. 1750-1950. INRA (Institut National de la Recherche Agronomique), Paris : 1-355.

External links
 
University of Bordeaux  In French Portrait, three plates.Links through to Gallica which has digitalised works by Chenu.
BHL Scanned books. Four works.

French naturalists
19th-century French physicians
French malacologists
1808 births
1879 deaths